Pélissier or Pelissier is a French surname. Notable people with the surname include: 

Aimable Pélissier (1794–1864), 1st Duc de Malakoff, Marshal of France
Anthony Pelissier (1912–1988), British film director and producer
Charles Pélissier (1903–1959), French cyclist
Christophe Pélissier:
Christophe Pélissier (1728–1779), French businessman
Christophe Pélissier (born 1965), French manager and former footballer
Éloi Pélissier, French rugby player
Francis Pélissier (1894–1959), French cyclist
H. G. Pelissier (1874–1913), British theatre producer
Henri Pélissier (1889–1935), French cyclist
Marie Pélissier (1706/7–1749), French singer
Matt Pelissier, American rock drummer
Olympe Pélissier (died 1878), salon hostess and second wife of Rossini
Philippe Pélissier, French figure skater
René Pelissier (1886–1969), French flying ace

See also
Pellissier

French-language surnames